Jean Borotra and René Lacoste were the defending champions, but decided not to play together. Lacoste partnered with Paul Féret but withdrew before the start of the competition. Borotra played with Léonce Aslangul, but lost to Jacques Brugnon and Henri Cochet in the quarterfinals.

Brugnon and Cochet defeated Howard Kinsey and Vincent Richards in the final, 7–5, 4–6, 6–3, 6–2 to win the gentlemen's doubles tennis title at the 1926 Wimbledon Championship.

The Duke of York, the future King George VI, remains the only member of the British royal family to ever compete at Wimbledon after competing in the men's doubles tournament. Partnering with his mentor and advisor Louis Greig, the pair were eliminated in the first round by former champions Herbert Roper Barrett and Arthur Gore.

Draw

Finals

Top half

Section 1

Section 2

Bottom half

Section 3

Section 4

References

External links

Men's Doubles
Wimbledon Championship by year – Men's doubles